Kaminonejima (Japanese: 上ノ根島, Kaminone-jima) or Kaminone Island, is a small uninhabited island located in the Tokara Islands of Kagoshima Prefecture, Japan.

It formed out of the same stratovolcano that created nearby Yokoate-jima, positioned 2.4 kilometers south of Kaminone.

See also 

 Tokara Islands
 Yokoate-jima
 Ryukyu Islands

References 

Uninhabited islands of Japan
Kagoshima Prefecture
Ryukyu Islands
Tokara Islands